Robert Décary (born May 26, 1944) is a former judge on the Canadian Federal Court of Appeal. Also per a June 13, 2013 CBC article is the watchdog at the Communications Security Establishment.

References

1944 births
Living people
Communications Security Establishment people
Judges of the Federal Court of Canada